Golden Fleece was an Australian brand of petroleum products and service stations operated by Harold Sleigh and Company. A partnership was founded in Melbourne, Australia in 1893 by shipowner and merchant Harold Crofton Sleigh (1867–1933) and manufacturer and shipowner John McIlwraith (1828–1902). In 1913 the company took delivery of its first consignment of motor spirit from the United States and marketed it in Australia as "Golden Fleece".

Initially, motor spirit was sold in drums only—the first Golden Fleece pump being installed in 1920. Golden Fleece was a pioneer of single-branded service stations (as opposed to the more common multi-brand offerings of the era), and its distinctive "golden merino" trademark was soon a common sight for Australian motorists.

The post-war era saw a massive expansion of Australia's motor industry and car ownership soared. The company was made public in 1947. These were boom times for Golden Fleece and expansion and acquisitions were the trend throughout the 1950s and 1960s. H.C. Sleigh Limited acquired the fledgling Kangaroo and Phillips 66 brands in 1962 and 1967 respectively. During these years, many (if not most) Golden Fleece service stations became roadhouse-style outlets with restaurants and bold signage.

Some time during the 1960s or 1970s Golden Fleece gained a major contract by the, then small, major trucking company Linfox, that is still held by Ampol today, due to a friendship between Regional Manager for Victoria Max Collins and Lindsay Fox.

The company never had its own oil refinery and depended on Caltex to facilitate the importation and refining of crude oils at Kurnell Refinery in Sydney on its behalf. In the late 1970s the industry started to mature and rationalise due to soaring crude oil prices, and Federal Government oversight of petrol and diesel prices which was a subtle form of price control. Inevitably Golden Fleece was itself acquired by Caltex in 1981 and no longer trades under that name, though its unique livery can still be seen on some older roadhouses in rural Australia. A particular treasure for collectors are the globes (in the shape of the Golden Fleece ram) that sat atop the company's pumps until the 1970s, when the pumps were standardised.

Purr Pull was a brand marketed by Independent Oil Industries of Sydney. They also sold Purr Star and Resis Oil. The company was bought out by Smith Wylie (Aust) Pty Ltd in Queensland who ran the company as Purr Pull Industries and then in June 1954, H.C. Sleigh merged with Purr Pull Industries, with the Purr Pull and Star brands dropped and all operations rebranded as Golden Fleece.

Executive

 Harold Sleigh, co-founder and Chairman 
 John McIlwraith 1893–1902, co-founder
 Hamilton Moreton Sleigh Chairman and CEO 1933–1975
 Peter Sleigh 1975–1981 Chairman and CEO

See also

List of automotive fuel retailers
List of convenience stores

References

Australian companies established in 1893
Retail companies established in 1893
Companies based in Melbourne
Defunct oil and gas companies of Australia
Energy companies established in 1893
Retail companies disestablished in 1981
Energy companies disestablished in 1981
1981 mergers and acquisitions
Automotive fuel retailers in Australia
Australian companies disestablished in 1981